The International Monohull Open Class Association (IMOCA)   is the governing body of the IMOCA class. Its main task is to design the class regulations for the ocean racing yachts IMOCA 50 and IMOCA 60 and organising regattas and single-handed circum-navigation regattas. It was established in 1991. IMOCA has been a member of the ISAF (International Sailing Federation) since 1999.

IMOCA organizes the Ocean Masters World Championship and is the sanctioning authority for the Barcelona World Race.

IMOCA-Regattas 
 Rolex Fastnet Race
 Transat Jacques Vabre
 Barcelona World Race
 Route du Rhum
 Vendée Globe

External links 
  IMOCA official website.

References

IMOCA